JJ White was an American country music duo from Yuba City, California composed of sisters Janice and Jayne White. Signed to Curb Records in 1989, the duo charted four singles on the Billboard Hot Country Singles & Tracks chart between 1991 and 1992. Their 1991 debut album, Janice and Jayne, received a B rating from Entertainment Weekly's Alanna Nash. Their second album Scratches on Her Knees was independently produced and released in 1999. Jayne White died in 2003 from cancer.

Discography

Albums

Singles

References

External links
[ JJ White] on Allmusic

Country music groups from California
Country music duos
Curb Records artists
Musical groups established in 1991
Musical groups disestablished in 2003
1991 establishments in California
Female musical duos
Sibling musical duos
People from Yuba City, California